Michael Woodford may refer to:

Michael Dean Woodford (born 1955), American macroeconomist
Michael Christopher Woodford (born 1960), former CEO of Olympus Corporation